Christopher or Chris Hackett may refer to:

Chris Hackett (American football) (born 1993), American football player
Chris Hackett (artist) (born 1972), American artist, engineer, and television presenter
Chris Hackett (footballer) (born 1983), English footballer
Chris Hackett (Pennsylvania politician), American politician
Christopher Fitzherbert Hackett, Barbadian diplomat